BattleTanx is a 1998 action game released for the Nintendo 64, produced by The 3DO Company. The game was followed by a 1999 sequel, titled BattleTanx: Global Assault.

Plot
The game is based in 2001 where a virus killed 99% of the female population. The story follows the main character, Griffin Spade, whose fiancé was taken by the U.S. Government in Queens, New York. The few remaining women left in the world, known as "Queenlords", are mostly held by gangs who have taken over parts of the world. Following Spade losing his fiancé to the government, New York gets destroyed and he claims a tank and sets out on an adventure across the United States to find her. After surviving the destruction of New York, Spade ventures westward gaining recruits in the countryside and battling gangs in Chicago, Las Vegas, and San Francisco.

Gameplay
There are three tanks in the game for the player to choose from. The player can choose between a Moto Tank, M1A1 Abrams MBT, or the Goliath. There are 17 levels to complete in order to finish the single player game, all of which are filled with enemy tanks. Each level is located in a specific place in the United States, such as New York City, Chicago, Las Vegas, and San Francisco. The game features destructible environments, and in some cases, interactive environments.

In the game's multiplayer mode, players can battle with up to 4 players simultaneously. There are four different multiplayer configurations; Battlelord mode (equivalent to capture the flag), Deathmatch, Family Mode, and Annihilation.
Battlelord Capture the opponent's Queenlords. 
Deathmatch The first to seven kills win. 
Family Mode Deathmatch, but ammo cannot be switched, only used up.
Tank wars provides each competitor with five tanks, last survivor wins.

Levels
The first three levels all take place in New York City and involve Queens, Queens Midtown Tunnel, and Times Square. The Chicago stage takes place in Lake Shore Drive and State Street. The Las Vegas stage takes place on the world-famous Fremont Street. The San Francisco stages take place on the Golden Gate Bridge, The Wharf, and the fictional Q-Zone.

Reception

The Nintendo 64 version received favorable reviews, while the Game Boy Color version received unfavorable reviews, according to the review aggregation website GameRankings. Next Generation said that the former console version was "fast [and] controls well, and it's got tanks blowing up everything in sight – sounds good to us."

Notes

References

External links
 
 

1998 video games
Action video games
Game Boy Color games
Nintendo 64 games
North America-exclusive video games
Post-apocalyptic video games
Tank simulation video games
Video games set in 2001
Video games set in Chicago
Video games set in New York City
Video games set in Nevada
Video games set in the Las Vegas Valley
Video games set in San Francisco
Multiplayer and single-player video games
Video games developed in the United States
Lucky Chicken Games games